Felipe José Almeida da Rocha (born 18 July 2002), commonly known as Felipinho, is a Brazilian footballer who plays as a forward for Avaí.

Club career
Born in Volta Redonda, Rio de Janeiro, Felipinho joined Flamengo's youth setup in 2018. In 2020, he was loaned to Avaí, later signing a permanent deal with the club.

On 23 May 2022, Felipinho renewed with Avaí until July 2024. He made his first team – and Série A – debut on 5 November, coming on as a second-half substitute for Marcinho in a 1–1 away draw against Santos.

Career statistics

References

2002 births
Living people
People from Volta Redonda
Brazilian footballers
Association football forwards
Campeonato Brasileiro Série A players
Avaí FC players